All the Real Girls is a 2003 American romantic drama film written and directed by David Gordon Green and starring Paul Schneider, Zooey Deschanel, Shea Whigham and Patricia Clarkson. It is about the romance between a young, small-town womanizer and his best friend’s sexually inexperienced younger sister. The film premiered at the Sundance Film Festival on January 19, 2003. The film was well received by critics and was nominated for several film festival awards, with Green winning a Special Jury Prize at Sundance.

Plot
A young womanizer living in a small Southern town, Paul earns a living fixing cars for his uncle. He still lives with his mother, Elvira, who works as a clown cheering up children at the local hospital.

Paul spends most of his time hanging out with his best friend and self-proclaimed partner-in-crime, Tip, and their friends Bo and Bust-Ass. Among his friends, Paul has a reputation as a ladies' man, but is not at all known for being involved with long-term relationships; most of his romances last only a few weeks, and he's slept with nearly every girl in town.

Beginning to reach a point where he would like to lead a different life, this feeling becomes much clearer when Paul meets Noel. She is Tip's teenage sister, who has returned home after attending boarding school. Noel is more thoughtful and mature than the girls Paul is used to.

Paul and Noel soon fall in love, but for him this is a different sort of relationship than he's accustomed to — Noel is still a virgin, and her contemplative nature gives him a desire to be a better, stronger person,

Tip does not approve of Paul dating his younger sister, which leads to a rift between these longtime friends.

Cast

Production

Development
Feeling unseen by the romance films released at the time, David Gordon Green and Paul Schneider conceived and began writing All the Real Girls during the late 90s. Green sought to make a film that was both "contemporary" and "how it feels when you get your gut in a knot". Following the release of his debut film George Washington, Green had several projects he intended to pursue, including a science fiction film and a western. However, when funding failed to come through for either project, Green got a job at a doorknob factory before turning back to All the Real Girls, a movie he felt "obligated" to make while in his youth and "while these feelings were still fresh and these wounds were still bleeding". Before partnering with Jean Doumanian and Lisa Muskat, a studio had offered Green a larger budget to produce the film; Green would pass due to the studio wanting to cast Freddie Prinze Jr. instead of Schneider.

Pre-production
Most of the crew of All the Real Girls was compromised of the same team from Green's George Washington, most of whom were colleagues from University of North Carolina School of the Arts. Schneider, who mostly had a background in editing, takes on the film's leading role. Feeling closely related to the character of Paul, Schneider said "All you need to do is to have grown up in North Carolina and had your heart broken, and you're good to go." For the character of Noel, Green and Schneider strived to get the casting "right". Zooey Deschanel was cast after Green and Schneider felt she embodied how they envisioned the character, and for elevating the material they had written for her. Danny McBride, who served as a second unit director on George Washington, was cast in the supporting role of Bust-Ass in his acting debut.

Filming
Principal photography for the film was underway in the fall of 2001 in Marshall and Asheville, North Carolina. During production, Green allowed the actors to take scenes in different directions from where the script initially went. This lead to the movie to take on a new "life of its own". Green also felt to stray away from genre cliches and scenes that had largely been done before. Instead he opted to focus on "unique magical moments". These decisions resulted in the first forty pages of the script being discarded from the final film, including a scene where Paul and Noel meet for the first time.

Reception

Box office 

All the Real Girls was given a limited release on February 14, 2003. It played in six theaters, bringing in $39,714 in its opening weekend. It grossed $579,986 on a $1 million budget.

Critical response 
The film received positive reviews. On Rotten Tomatoes, it has an approval rating of 71%, based on 115 reviews, with an average rating of 6.9/10. The site's consensus states, "Has enough honest moments to warrant a look." On Metacritic, it has a score of 71 out of 100, based on 36 critics, indicating "generally favorable reviews".

Roger Ebert of the Chicago Sun Times said “Green is 27, old enough to be jaded, but he has the soul of a romantic poet. Wordsworth, after all, was 36 when he published, ‘The Rainbow comes and goes and lovely as the Rose.’ How many guys that age would have that kind of nerve today?” He gave the film a four out of four star rating.

Awards and nominations 

The film was nominated for awards at several different film festivals globally. Green was nominated for the Grand Jury Prize at the Sundance Film Festival, and ended up winning the Special Jury Prize for Emotional Truth, as did Patricia Clarkson for Outstanding Performance. Zooey Deschanel was nominated for Best Female Lead at the 2004 Independent Spirit Awards and Best Actress at the 2004 Mar del Plata Film Festival.

References

External links
 
 
 

2003 films
2003 romantic drama films
American romantic drama films
Films shot in North Carolina
Films set in the Southern United States
Films directed by David Gordon Green
American independent films
Films produced by Jean Doumanian
2003 independent films
Films about mother–son relationships
Sony Pictures Classics films
2000s English-language films
2000s American films
Sundance Film Festival award winners